Tarana-i-Pakistan, or more popularly known as Pakistan Zindabad, was an alternative national anthem sung by East Pakistan during its existence until liberation of Bangladesh in 1971. The song is in Bengali, the language of East Pakistan, and was adopted from a poem by an East Pakistani poet Golam Mostofa with the name of Tarana-i-Pakistan in 1956. It was composed by Nazir Ahmed. The song was sung during school assemblies in East Pakistan by school children.

Lyrics

Bengali original

English translation
May the Land of the Pure live long, may the Land of the Pure live long, may the Land of the Pure live long
In the lush greenery of East Bengal, in the red glow of the banks of the five rivers
In the grey deserts of Sindh, the flag awakens a freedom
May the Land of the Pure live long, may the Land of the Pure live long, may the Land of the Pure live long
At the peak of the Frontier's frigid mountains, it flies the symbol of victory in its skies
In the reflections of the Jhelum and the Beas, the taste of freedom has been found
May the Land of the Pure live long, may the Land of the Pure live long, may the Land of the Pure live long
The binding necklace of equality and alliance, those that have monotheistic teachings in their throats
Teesta and Vitasta hitherto wipes its fatigue, sorrow and grief
May the Land of the Pure live long, may the Land of the Pure live long, may the Land of the Pure live long
Its flagbearers at the Khyber Pass, valiant sepoys at the banks of the Meghna
We sing the union of the Orient and the Occident, cultivating the world
May the Land of the Pure live long, may the Land of the Pure live long, may the Land of the Pure live long

See also
 Qaumi Tarana
 Tarana-i-Pakistan

References

Pakistani patriotic songs
Bangladeshi poems
Bengali-language songs
Pakistan national anthems
Asian anthems
Bengali-language poems